51 Eridani b is a "Jupiter-like" planet that orbits the young F0 V star 51 Eridani, in the constellation Eridanus. It is 96 light years away from the solar system, and it is approximately 20 million years old.

Discovery 
51 Eridani b was announced in August 2015, but was discovered in December 2014 using the Gemini Planet Imager, an international project led by the Kavli Institute for Particle Astrophysics and Cosmology. 51 Eridani b is the first exoplanet discovered by the Gemini Planet Imager. The Gemini Planet Imager was specifically created to discern and evaluate dim, newer planets orbiting bright stars through “direct imaging.” Direct imaging allows astronomers to use adaptive optics to sharpen the resolution of the image of a target star, then obstruct its starlight. Any residual incoming light is then scrutinized, and the brightest spots suggest a possible planet. Prior to the discovery of 51 Eridani b, each of the directly imaged worlds previously discovered had been gas giants many times the mass of Jupiter.

Physical characteristics 
The planet has a mass at least 2.6, but not more than 11. Its radius is about 1.11 times the radius of Jupiter. It orbits 11.1 AU from its host star, and has an orbital period of roughly 10,000 days. The average temperature is 807 K, which is substantially hotter than the 130 K average temperature of Jupiter, the planet in the Solar System of closest size.

Atmosphere
'51 Eridani b' has relatively low C/O molar ratio of 0.38. The planet has the second strongest methane signature of any exoplanet, after GJ 504 b. This methane signature, along with the low luminosity of the object, should produce additional clues as to how 51 Eridani b was formed. Astronomers also detected the presence of water and ammonia in the planet's spectrum. Atmospheric modeling favors a low surface gravity and a partly cloudy atmosphere.

References 

Eridanus (constellation)
Exoplanets discovered in 2014
Exoplanets detected by direct imaging
Exoplanets detected by astrometry